These are the results of the 2000 Ibero-American Championships in Athletics which took place on May 20–21, 2000 on Estádio Célio de Barros in Rio de Janeiro, Brazil.

Men's results

100 meters

Heats – May 20Wind:Heat 1: 0.0 m/s, Heat 2: 0.0 m/s

Final – May 20Wind:0.0 m/s

200 meters

Heats – May 21Wind:Heat 1: 0.0 m/s, Heat 2: 0.0 m/s

Final – May 21Wind:+0.6 m/s

400 meters
May 21

800 meters
May 20

1500 meters
May 21

5000 meters
May 20

10,000 meters
May 21

110 meters hurdles
May 21Wind: 0.0 m/s

400 meters hurdles
May 20

3000 meters steeplechase
May 21

4 x 100 meters relay
May 20

4 x 400 meters relay
May 21

20,000 meters walk
May 20

High jump
May 20

Pole vault
May 20

Long jump
May 20

Triple jump
May 21

Shot put
May 20

Discus throw
May 21

Hammer throw
May 21

Javelin throw
May 20

Decathlon
May 20–21

Women's results

100 meters

Heats – May 20Wind:Heat 1: 0.0 m/s, Heat 2: 0.0 m/s

Final – May 20Wind:0.0 m/s

200 meters

Heats – May 21Wind:Heat 1: +1.6 m/s, Heat 2: 0.0 m/s

Final – May 21Wind:-1.0 m/s

400 meters
May 21

800 meters
May 20

1500 meters
May 21

5000 meters
May 20

10,000 meters
May 21

100 meters hurdles

Heats – May 21Wind:Heat 1: +0.6 m/s, Heat 2: 0.0 m/s

May 21Wind:+0.9 m/s

400 meters hurdles
May 20

3000 meters steeplechase
May 20

4 x 100 meters relay
May 20

4 x 400 meters relay
May 21

10,000 meters walk
May 20

High jump
May 21

Pole vault
May 21

Long jump
May 20

Triple jump
May 21

Shot put
May 21

Discus throw
May 20

Hammer throw
May 20

Javelin throw
May 21

Heptathlon
May 20–21

References

Day 1 results
Day 2 results

Ibero-American Championships Results
Events at the Ibero-American Championships in Athletics